Aloisia Brial (died 1972) was a queen of Uvea, ruling from 1953 until 1958.  She was preceded by Soane Toke, and succeeded by Tomasi Kulimoetoke II.

Uvea is also known as Wallis Island of the Territory of Wallis and Futuna Islands.

Her grandsons Sylvain Brial and Gil Brial are Member of the French Parliament and the Congress of New Caledonia respectively.

References

Year of birth missing
1972 deaths
Wallis and Futuna monarchs
Queens regnant in Oceania
20th-century women rulers